GLONASS is a Russian satellite navigation system operating as part of a radionavigation-satellite service. It provides an alternative to Global Positioning System (GPS) and is the second navigational system in operation with global coverage and of comparable precision.

Satellite navigation devices supporting both GPS and GLONASS have more satellites available, meaning positions can be fixed more quickly and accurately, especially in built-up areas where buildings may obscure the view to some satellites. GLONASS supplementation of GPS systems also improves positioning in high latitudes (north or south).

Development of GLONASS began in the Soviet Union in 1976. Beginning on 12 October 1982, numerous rocket launches added satellites to the system, until the completion of the constellation in 1995. After a decline in capacity during the late 1990s, in 2001, the restoration of the system was made a government priority and funding increased substantially. GLONASS is the most expensive program of the Roscosmos, consuming a third of its budget in 2010.

By 2010, GLONASS had achieved full coverage of Russia's territory. In October 2011 the full orbital constellation of 24 satellites was restored, enabling full global coverage. The GLONASS satellites' designs have undergone several upgrades, with the latest version, GLONASS-K2, scheduled to enter service in 2023.

System description 

GLONASS is a global navigation satellite system, providing real time position and velocity determination for military and civilian users. The satellites are located in middle circular orbit at  altitude with a 64.8° inclination and a period of 11 hours and 15 minutes. GLONASS's orbit makes it especially suited for usage in high latitudes (north or south), where getting a GPS signal can be problematic. 

The constellation operates in three orbital planes, with eight evenly spaced satellites on each. A fully operational constellation with global coverage consists of 24 satellites, while 18 satellites are necessary for covering the territory of Russia. To get a position fix the receiver must be in the range of at least four satellites.

Signal

FDMA 

GLONASS satellites transmit two types of signal: open standard-precision signal L1OF/L2OF, and obfuscated high-precision signal L1SF/L2SF.

The signals use similar DSSS encoding and binary phase-shift keying (BPSK) modulation as in GPS signals. All GLONASS satellites transmit the same code as their standard-precision signal; however each transmits on a different frequency using a 15-channel frequency-division multiple access (FDMA) technique spanning either side from 1602.0 MHz, known as the L1 band. The center frequency is 1602 MHz + n × 0.5625 MHz, where n is a satellite's frequency channel number (n=−6,...,0,...,6, previously n=0,...,13). Signals are transmitted in a 38° cone, using right-hand circular polarization, at an EIRP between 25 and 27 dBW (316 to 500 watts). Note that the 24-satellite constellation is accommodated with only 15 channels by using identical frequency channels to support antipodal (opposite side of planet in orbit) satellite pairs, as these satellites are never both in view of an Earth-based user at the same time.

The L2 band signals use the same FDMA as the L1 band signals, but transmit straddling 1246 MHz with the center frequency 1246 MHz + n × 0.4375 MHz, where n spans the same range as for L1. In the original GLONASS design, only obfuscated high-precision signal was broadcast in the L2 band, but starting with GLONASS-M, an additional civil reference signal L2OF is broadcast with an identical standard-precision code to the L1OF signal.

The open standard-precision signal is generated with modulo-2 addition (XOR) of 511 kbit/s pseudo-random ranging code, 50 bit/s navigation message, and an auxiliary 100 Hz meander sequence (Manchester code), all generated using a single time/frequency oscillator. The pseudo-random code is generated with a 9-stage shift register operating with a period of 1 milliseconds.

The navigational message is modulated at 50 bits per second. The superframe of the open signal is 7500 bits long and consists of 5 frames of 30 seconds, taking 150 seconds (2.5 minutes) to transmit the continuous message. Each frame is 1500 bits long and consists of 15 strings of 100 bits (2 seconds for each string), with 85 bits (1.7 seconds) for data and check-sum bits, and 15 bits (0.3 seconds) for time mark. Strings 1-4 provide immediate data for the transmitting satellite, and are repeated every frame; the data include ephemeris, clock and frequency offsets, and satellite status. Strings 5-15 provide non-immediate data (i.e. almanac) for each satellite in the constellation, with frames I-IV each describing five satellites, and frame V describing remaining four satellites.

The ephemerides are updated every 30 minutes using data from the Ground Control segment; they use Earth Centred Earth Fixed (ECEF) Cartesian coordinates in position and velocity, and include lunisolar acceleration parameters. The almanac uses modified orbital elements (Keplerian elements) and is updated daily.

The more accurate high-precision signal is available for authorized users, such as the Russian military, yet unlike the United States P(Y) code, which is modulated by an encrypting W code, the GLONASS restricted-use codes are broadcast in the clear using only security through obscurity. The details of the high-precision signal have not been disclosed. The modulation (and therefore the tracking strategy) of the data bits on the L2SF code has recently changed from unmodulated to 250 bit/s burst at random intervals. The L1SF code is modulated by the navigation data at 50 bit/s without a Manchester meander code.

The high-precision signal is broadcast in phase quadrature with the standard-precision signal, effectively sharing the same carrier wave, but with a ten-times-higher bandwidth than the open signal. The message format of the high-precision signal remains unpublished, although attempts at reverse-engineering indicate that the superframe is composed of 72 frames, each containing 5 strings of 100 bits and taking 10 seconds to transmit, with total length of 36 000 bits or 720 seconds (12 minutes) for the whole navigational message. The additional data are seemingly allocated to critical Lunisolar acceleration parameters and clock correction terms.

Accuracy 
At peak efficiency, the standard-precision signal offers horizontal positioning accuracy within 5–10 metres, vertical positioning within , a velocity vector measuring within , and timing within 200 nanoseconds, all based on measurements from four first-generation satellites simultaneously; newer satellites such as GLONASS-M improve on this.

GLONASS uses a coordinate datum named "PZ-90" (Earth Parameters 1990 – Parametry Zemli 1990), in which the precise location of the North Pole is given as an average of its position from 1990 to 1995. This is in contrast to the GPS's coordinate datum, WGS 84, which uses the location of the North Pole in 1984. Since 31 December 2013, version PZ-90.11 is being broadcast, which is aligned to the International Terrestrial Reference System and Frame 2008 at epoch 2011.0 at the centimetre level, but ideally a conversion to ITRF2008 should be done.

CDMA 
Since 2008, new CDMA signals are being researched for use with GLONASS.

The interface control documents for GLONASS CDMA signals was published in August 2016.

According to GLONASS developers, there will be three open and two restricted CDMA signals. The open signal L3OC is centered at 1202.025 MHz and uses BPSK(10) modulation for both data and pilot channels; the ranging code transmits at 10.23 million chips per second, modulated onto the carrier frequency using QPSK with in-phase data and quadrature pilot. The data is error-coded with 5-bit Barker code and the pilot with 10-bit Neuman-Hoffman code.

Open L1OC and restricted L1SC signals are centered at 1600.995 MHz, and open L2OC and restricted L2SC signals are centered at 1248.06 MHz, overlapping with GLONASS FDMA signals. Open signals L1OC and L2OC use time-division multiplexing to transmit pilot and data signals, with BPSK(1) modulation for data and BOC(1,1) modulation for pilot; wide-band restricted signals L1SC and L2SC use BOC (5, 2.5) modulation for both data and pilot, transmitted in quadrature phase to the open signals; this places peak signal strength away from the center frequency of narrow-band open signals.

Binary phase-shift keying (BPSK) is used by standard GPS and GLONASS signals. Binary offset carrier (BOC) is the modulation used by Galileo, modernized GPS, and BeiDou-2.

The navigational message of CDMA signals is transmitted as a sequence of text strings. The message has variable size - each pseudo-frame usually includes six strings and contains ephemerides for the current satellite (string types 10, 11, and 12 in a sequence) and part of the almanac for three satellites (three strings of type 20). To transmit the full almanac for all current 24 satellites, a superframe of 8 pseudo-frames is required. In the future, the superframe will be expanded to 10 pseudo-frames of data to cover full 30 satellites.

The message can also contain Earth's rotation parameters, ionosphere models, long-term orbit parameters for GLONASS satellites, and COSPAS-SARSAT messages. The system time marker is transmitted with each string; UTC leap second correction is achieved by shortening or lengthening (zero-padding) the final string of the day by one second, with abnormal strings being discarded by the receiver. 

The strings have a version tag to facilitate forward compatibility: future upgrades to the message format will not break older equipment, which will continue to work by ignoring new data (as long as the constellation still transmits old string types), but up-to-date equipment will be able to use additional information from newer satellites.

The navigational message of the L3OC signal is transmitted at 100 bit/s, with each string of symbols taking 3 seconds (300 bits). A pseudo-frame of 6 strings takes 18 seconds (1800 bits) to transmit. A superframe of 8 pseudo-frames is 14,400 bits long and takes 144 seconds (2 minutes 24 seconds) to transmit the full almanac.

The navigational message of the L1OC signal is transmitted at 100 bit/s. The string is 250 bits long and takes 2.5 seconds to transmit. A pseudo-frame is 1500 bits (15 seconds) long, and a superframe is 12,000 bits or 120 seconds (2 minutes).

L2OC signal does not transmit any navigational message, only the pseudo-range codes:

Glonass-K1 test satellite launched in 2011 introduced L3OC signal. Glonass-M satellites produced since 2014 (s/n 755+) will also transmit L3OC signal for testing purposes.

Enhanced Glonass-K1 and Glonass-K2 satellites, to be launched from 2023, will feature a full suite of modernized CDMA signals in the existing L1 and L2 bands, which includes L1SC, L1OC, L2SC, and L2OC, as well as the L3OC signal. Glonass-K2 series should gradually replace existing satellites starting from 2023, when Glonass-M launches will cease.

Glonass-KM satellites will be launched by 2025. Additional open signals are being studied for these satellites, based on frequencies and formats used by existing GPS, Galileo, and Beidou/COMPASS signals:

 open signal L1OCM using BOC(1,1) modulation centered at 1575.42 MHz, similar to modernized GPS signal L1C, Galileo signal E1, and Beidou/COMPASS signal B1C;
 open signal L5OCM using BPSK(10) modulation centered at 1176.45 MHz, similar to the GPS "Safety of Life" (L5), Galileo signal E5a, and Beidou/COMPASS signal B2a;
 open signal L3OCM using BPSK(10) modulation centered at 1207.14 MHz, similar to Galileo signal E5b and Beidou/COMPASS signal B2b.
Such an arrangement will allow easier and cheaper implementation of multi-standard GNSS receivers.

With the introduction of CDMA signals, the constellation will be expanded to 30 active satellites by 2025; this may require eventual deprecation of FDMA signals. The new satellites will be deployed into three additional planes, bringing the total to six planes from the current three—aided by System for Differential Correction and Monitoring (SDCM), which is a GNSS augmentation system based on a network of ground-based control stations and communication satellites Luch 5A and Luch 5B.

Six additional Glonass-V satellites, using Tundra orbit in three orbital planes, will be launched starting in 2025; this regional high-orbit segment will offer increased regional availability and 25% improvement in precision over Eastern Hemisphere, similar to Japanese QZSS system and Beidou-1. The new satellites will form two ground traces with inclination of 64.8°, eccentricity of 0.072, period of 23.9 hours, and ascending node longitude of 60° and 120°. Glonass-V vehicles are based on Glonass-K platform and will broadcast new CDMA signals only. Previously Molniya orbit, geosynchronous orbit, or inclined orbit were also under consideration for the regional segment.

Navigational message

L1OC

L3OC

Common properties of open CDMA signals

Satellites 

The main contractor of the GLONASS program is Joint Stock Company Information Satellite Systems Reshetnev (ISS Reshetnev, formerly called NPO-PM). The company, located in Zheleznogorsk, is the designer of all GLONASS satellites, in cooperation with the Institute for Space Device Engineering (:ru:РНИИ КП) and the Russian Institute of Radio Navigation and Time. Serial production of the satellites is accomplished by the company Production Corporation Polyot in Omsk.

Over the three decades of development, the satellite designs have gone through numerous improvements, and can be divided into three generations: the original GLONASS (since 1982), GLONASS-M (since 2003) and GLONASS-K (since 2011). Each GLONASS satellite has a GRAU designation 11F654, and each of them also has the military "Cosmos-NNNN" designation.

First generation 

The true first generation of GLONASS (also called Uragan) satellites were all three-axis stabilized vehicles, generally weighing  and were equipped with a modest propulsion system to permit relocation within the constellation. Over time they were upgraded to Block IIa, IIb, and IIv vehicles, with each block containing evolutionary improvements.

Six Block IIa satellites were launched in 1985–1986 with improved time and frequency standards over the prototypes, and increased frequency stability. These spacecraft also demonstrated a 16-month average operational lifetime. Block IIb spacecraft, with a two-year design lifetimes, appeared in 1987, of which a total of 12 were launched, but half were lost in launch vehicle accidents. The six spacecraft that made it to orbit worked well, operating for an average of nearly 22 months.

Block IIv was the most prolific of the first generation. Used exclusively from 1988 to 2000, and continued to be included in launches through 2005, a total of 56 satellites were launched. The design life was three years, however numerous spacecraft exceeded this, with one late model lasting 68 months, nearly double.

Block II satellites were typically launched three at a time from the Baikonur Cosmodrome using Proton-K Blok-DM2 or Proton-K Briz-M boosters. The only exception was when, on two launches, an Etalon geodetic reflector satellite was substituted for a GLONASS satellite.

Second generation 

The second generation of satellites, known as Glonass-M, were developed beginning in 1990 and first launched in 2003. The aft payload structure houses 12 primary antennas for L-band transmissions. Laser corner-cube reflectors are also carried to aid in precise orbit determination and geodetic research. On-board cesium clocks provide the local clock source. 52 Glonass-M have been produced and launched.

A total of 41 second generation satellites were launched through the end of 2013. As with the previous generation, the second generation spacecraft were launched three at a time using Proton-K Blok-DM2 or Proton-K Briz-M boosters. Some were launched alone with Soyuz-2-1b/Fregat.

In July 2015, ISS Reshetnev announced that it had completed the last GLONASS-M (No. 61) spacecraft and it was putting it in storage waiting for launch, along with eight previously built satellites.

As on 22 September 2017, GLONASS-M No.52 satellite went into operation and the orbital grouping has again increased to 24 space vehicles.

Third generation 

Glonass-K consist of 26 satellites having satellite index 65-98 and widely used in Russian Military space. 

The new satellite's advanced equipment—made solely from Russian components — will allow the doubling of GLONASS' accuracy. As with the previous satellites, these are 3-axis stabilized, nadir pointing with dual solar arrays. The first GLONASS-K satellite was successfully launched on 26 February 2011.

Due to their weight reduction, GLONASS-K spacecraft can be launched in pairs from the Plesetsk Cosmodrome launch site using the substantially lower cost Soyuz-2.1b boosters or in six-at-once from the Baikonur Cosmodrome using Proton-K Briz-M launch vehicles.

Ground control 

The ground control segment of GLONASS is almost entirely located within former Soviet Union territory, except for several in Brazil and one in Nicaragua.

The GLONASS ground segment consists of:
 
 a system control centre; 
 five Telemetry, Tracking and Command centers; 
 two Laser Ranging Stations; and
 ten Monitoring and Measuring Stations.

Receivers 

Companies producing GNSS receivers making use of GLONASS:
 Furuno
 JAVAD GNSS, Inc
 Septentrio
 Topcon
 C-Nav
 Magellan Navigation
 Novatel
 ComNav technology Ltd.
 Leica Geosystems
 Hemisphere GNSS 
 Trimble Inc
 u-blox
NPO Progress describes a receiver called GALS-A1, which combines GPS and GLONASS reception.

SkyWave Mobile Communications manufactures an Inmarsat-based satellite communications terminal that uses both GLONASS and GPS.

, some of the latest receivers in the Garmin eTrex line also support GLONASS (along with GPS). Garmin also produce a standalone Bluetooth receiver, the GLO for Aviation, which combines GPS, WAAS and GLONASS.

Various smartphones from 2011 onwards have integrated GLONASS capability in addition to their pre-existing GPS receivers, with the intention of reducing signal acquisition periods by allowing the device to pick up more satellites than with a single-network receiver, including devices from: 
 Xiaomi
 Sony Ericsson 
 ZTE
 Huawei 
 Samsung 
 Apple (since iPhone 4S)
 HTC
 LG
 Motorola
 Nokia

Status

Availability 
, the GLONASS constellation status is:

The system requires 18 satellites for continuous navigation services covering all of Russia, and 24 satellites to provide services worldwide. The GLONASS system covers 100% of worldwide territory.

On 2 April 2014, the system experienced a technical failure that resulted in practical unavailability of the navigation signal for around 12 hours.

On 14–15 April 2014, nine GLONASS satellites experienced a technical failure due to software problems.

On 19 February 2016, three GLONASS satellites experienced a technical failure: the batteries of GLONASS-738 exploded, the batteries of GLONASS-737 were depleted, and GLONASS-736 experienced a stationkeeping failure due to human error during maneuvering. GLONASS-737 and GLONASS-736 are expected to be operational again after maintenance, and one new satellite (GLONASS-751) to replace GLONASS-738 is expected to complete commissioning in early March 2016. The full capacity of the satellite group is expected to be restored in the middle of March 2016.

After the launching of two new satellites and maintenance of two others, the full capacity of the satellite group was restored.

Accuracy 

Some modern receivers are able to use both GLONASS and GPS satellites together, providing greatly improved coverage in urban canyons and giving a very fast time to fix due to over 50 satellites being available. In indoor, urban canyon or mountainous areas, accuracy can be greatly improved over using GPS alone.

In particular, the latest satellite design, GLONASS-K has the ability to double the system's accuracy once introduced. The system's ground segment is also to undergo improvements. As of early 2012, sixteen positioning ground stations are under construction in Russia and in the Antarctic at the Bellingshausen and Novolazarevskaya bases. New stations will be built around the southern hemisphere from Brazil to Indonesia. Together, these improvements are expected to bring GLONASS' accuracy to 0.6 m or better by 2020. The setup of a GLONASS receiving station in the Philippines is also now under negotiation.

History

See also 
 Aviaconversiya – a Russian satellite navigation firm
 BeiDou – Chinese counterpart
 Era-glonass – GLONASS-based system of emergency response
 Galileo – European Union's counterpart
 Global Positioning System - American counterpart
 List of GLONASS satellites
 Multilateration – the mathematical technique used for positioning
 NAVIC – Indian counterpart
 Tsikada – a Russian satellite navigation system

Notes

References

Standards

Bibliography 
 GLONASS Interface Control Document, Edition 5.1, 2008 (backup)
 GLONASS Interface Control Document, Version 4.0, 1998

External links 

 Official GLONASS web page 

 
Navigation satellite constellations
Space program of Russia
Space program of the Soviet Union
Soviet inventions
Wireless locating
Earth observation satellites of the Soviet Union
Military equipment introduced in the 1980s